Oakville is a census-designated place (CDP) in the  of Napa County, northern California.

The population was 71 at the 2010 census. Oakville's ZIP Code is 94562, and it is located in area code 707.

The local economy is based on Napa Valley wine production, and Oakville was formally declared a distinct appellation within the Napa Valley AVA in 1993.

History
Oakville started life in the 1860s as a water stop for the steam train owned by The Napa Valley Railroad Company.   The railroad, founded by early California pioneer Samuel Brannan in 1864, shuttled tourists between ferry boats that docked in Vallejo to the resort town of Calistoga.  The village gained its name from the dense groves of dark green valley oaks of the area.

H. W. Crabb turned Oakville from untamed country to wine country after his 1868 purchase of  close to the Napa River. Crabb established a vineyard and winery naming it To Kalon, which in Greek means "the beautiful."

In 1903 the U.S. Department of Agriculture established an experimental vineyard station in Oakville. This vineyard known as "Oakville Station" is operated by the University of California, Davis. The Robert Mondavi Winery is located between Oakville and Rutherford, California (though its corporate headquarters are in nearby St. Helena). To Kalon was part of Mondavi's original inventory when it was established in 1965. Another Mondavi venture in Oakville is Opus One Winery. Heitz Wine Cellars' Martha's Vineyard is also located within the Oakville appellation.

Modern day tourists traveling on State Route 29 often include a stop at Oakville Grocery, one of the area's few non-winery business, in order to purchase picnic supplies.  The Napa Valley Wine Train runs through Oakville on the same route that the original steam train ran on in the 19th century.

Geography
According to the United States Census Bureau, the CDP covers an area of 1.4 square miles (3.5 km), all of it land. Historically, Oakville has been the location of a lode of quicksilver.

Demographics
The 2010 United States Census reported that Oakville had a population of 71. The racial makeup of Oakville was 26 (36.6%) White, 0 (0.0%) African American, 1 (1.4%) Native American, 1 (1.4%) Asian, 1 (1.4%) Pacific Islander, 38 (53.5%) from other races, and 4 (5.6%) from two or more races. Hispanic or Latino of any race were 45 persons (63.4%).

The Census reported that 71 people (100% of the population) lived in households, 0 (0%) lived in non-institutionalized group quarters, and 0 (0%) were institutionalized.

There were 27 households, out of which 10 (37.0%) had children under the age of 18 living in them, 13 (48.1%) were opposite-sex married couples living together, 3 (11.1%) had a female householder with no husband present, 2 (7.4%) had a male householder with no wife present.  There were 2 (7.4%) unmarried opposite-sex partnerships, and 0 (0%) same-sex married couples or partnerships. 7 households (25.9%) were made up of individuals, and 3 (11.1%) had someone living alone who was 65 years of age or older. The average household size was 2.63.  There were 18 families (66.7% of all households); the average family size was 3.28.

The population was spread out, with 20 people (28.2%) under the age of 18, 9 people (12.7%) aged 18 to 24, 15 people (21.1%) aged 25 to 44, 18 people (25.4%) aged 45 to 64, and 9 people (12.7%) who were 65 years of age or older.  The median age was 36.2 years. For every 100 females, there were 97.2 males.  For every 100 females age 18 and over, there were 104.0 males.

The homeowner vacancy rate was 0%; the rental vacancy rate was 18.2%.  16 people (22.5% of the population) lived in owner-occupied housing units and 55 people (77.5%) lived in rental housing units.

Government
On the Napa County Board of Supervisors Oakville is in District 3 and is represented by Diane Dillon.

See also
 Oakville AVA

References

External links

 Appellation America webpage for Oakville
 Oakville Winegrowers website

Census-designated places in Napa County, California
Napa Valley
California wine
Census-designated places in California